Each year the Louisiana Mr. Basketball award is given to the person chosen as the best high school boys basketball player in the U.S. state of Louisiana, in the United States.

Award winners

References

High school basketball in Louisiana
Mr. and Miss Basketball awards
Awards established in 1996
Lists of people from Louisiana
Mr. Basketball